Schoolcraft may refer to:

Adrian Schoolcraft a former New York Police Department officer  
Jane Johnston Schoolcraft (1800-1842), Native American author 
Henry Schoolcraft (1793–1864), American geographer, geologist, and ethnologist, husband of Mary
Mary Howard Schoolcraft (1820-1878), American writer, wife of Henry

The following place names and geographic features in the United States are all named after Henry Schoolcraft:

Schoolcraft College, Livonia, Michigan
Schoolcraft, Michigan, village in Kalamazoo County
Schoolcraft County, Michigan
Schoolcraft Township, Houghton County, Michigan
Schoolcraft Township, Kalamazoo County, Michigan
Schoolcraft Township, Hubbard County, Minnesota
Schoolcraft River, tributary of the Mississippi River in Minnesota